Férébory Doré (born 21 January 1989) is a Congolese professional footballer who plays as a forward. Between 2010 and 2017, he made 37 appearances scoring 10 goals for the Congo national team.

Club career

Early years
Doré started his professional career with Angers SCO. During his four years at Stade Jean-Bouin, he scored 11 goals in 105 matches.

On 23 July 2013, Doré signed for Petrolul Ploiești after being linked with a move to Lille.

Botev Plovdiv
On 18 January 2014, Doré joined Bulgarian club Botev Plovdiv. He has mainly played as a starter for the team and scored a number of crucial goals such as a winner in a Cup game against Levski Sofia.

Between 28 June and early September, Doré was absent from the side and did not participate in any training sessions or matches, mainly due to his commitments to the Congo national team, with the Botev management on occasions unable to establish contact with the player. On 8 September 2014, it was announced that Doré has been loaned to CFR Cluj until the end of the season.

After three years and a half with Angers, he returned to Botev Plovdiv in February 2019 with a new contract.

International career
Doré represented the Congo national team at the 2015 Africa Cup of Nations, where his team advanced to the quarterfinals.

Career statistics

Club

International

Scores and results list Congo's goal tally first, score column indicates score after each Doré goal.

References

External links
 Férébory Doré career statistics at Canal +
 
 

1989 births
Living people
Sportspeople from Brazzaville
Republic of the Congo footballers
Association football forwards
Republic of the Congo international footballers
2015 Africa Cup of Nations players
AS Kondzo players
Angers SCO players
FC Petrolul Ploiești players
Botev Plovdiv players
CFR Cluj players
Ligue 2 players
Liga I players
First Professional Football League (Bulgaria) players
Republic of the Congo expatriate footballers
Expatriate footballers in France
Republic of the Congo expatriate sportspeople in France
Expatriate footballers in Romania
Republic of the Congo expatriate sportspeople in Romania
Expatriate footballers in Bulgaria